The Bitter Creek National Wildlife Refuge is located in the foothills of the southwestern San Joaquin Valley in Kern County, California. The refuge is one of four units of the Hopper Mountain National Wildlife Refuge Complex for California condors.

California condors
Purchased to protect dwindling California condor foraging and roosting habitat in 1985, the  refuge is the site where the last wild female condor was trapped in 1986.

The reintroduced condors feed and roost on the refuge. The refuge is an integral part of the Service's condor monitoring activities. The most notable physical features of the refuge are the San Andreas Fault, which bisects the refuge, and the dramatic Bitter Creek Canyon.

As of July 2014, there is a total population of 437 condors living in sites in California, Baja California and Arizona. This includes a wild population of 232 and a captive population of 205. Sixty-eight free-flying Condors are managed by the US Fish & Wildlife Service in Southern California.

Other species
In addition to the California condor, the Bitter Creek Refuge provides grassland, oak woodland, chaparral, pinion pine/juniper/oak woodland, and riparian and wetland habitat for federally listed endangered San Joaquin kit fox, blunt-nosed leopard lizard, giant kangaroo rat, and species of Federal concern such as the western spadefoot toad, the western horned lizard and the tri-colored blackbird.

Other terrestrial species on the refuge include coyote, bobcat, mountain lion, mule deer, pronghorn, tule elk, and western rattlesnake. A total of 119 bird species have been recorded on the refuge including 90 migratory species.

References

Bitter Creek National Wildlife Refuge profile
Official Bitter Creek National Wildlife Refuge website

External links

Condor Watch The Condor Watch crowdsourcing project, started April 2014.

National Wildlife Refuges in California
Protected areas of the Sierra Nevada (United States)
Protected areas of Kern County, California
Wetlands of California
Landforms of Kern County, California
1985 establishments in California
Protected areas established in 1985